Falcatifolium falciforme is a species of conifer in the family Podocarpaceae. It is found  in Brunei, Indonesia, and Malaysia on the Malay Peninsula and Borneo.

Habitat and ecology
Falcatifolium falciforme is most commonly found on mountain ridges where forest is more sparse. This fern can grow in areas of leached podzolic sands or can grow near larger conifer trees in more fertile soils.

References

Podocarpaceae
Least concern plants
Taxonomy articles created by Polbot
Plants described in 1868
Flora of the Borneo montane rain forests
Flora of Borneo
Flora of Peninsular Malaysia